Flambards is a novel for children or young adults by K. M. Peyton, first published by Oxford University Press in 1967 with illustrations by Victor Ambrus. Alternatively, "Flambards" is the trilogy (1967–1969) or series (1967–1981) named after its first book. The series is set in England just before, during, and after World War I.

The novel Flambards (book one) features a teenage orphan and heiress Christina Parsons, who comes to live at Flambards, the impoverished Essex estate owned by her crippled and tyrannical uncle, William Russell, and his two sons, Mark and Will.

Novel summary 

Christina Parsons, who has been shunted around the family since she was orphaned at the age of five years in 1901, is sent to live at Flambards with her mother's half-brother, the crippled Russell. Her Aunt Grace speculates that Russell plans for Christina to marry his son Mark to restore Flambards to its former glory using the money that she will inherit on her twenty-first birthday. Mark is as brutish as his father, with a great love for hunting, whereas the younger son William is terrified of horses after a hunting accident and aspires to be an aviator. Christina soon finds friendship with the injured William, who challenges her ideas on class boundaries, as well as her love for horses and hunting. William and Christina eventually fall in love and run away from the hunt ball to London, hoping to marry.

Series

The fourth book controversially reversed the ending of the original trilogy, twelve years later and following the television series.

 Flambards (Oxford, 1967)
 The Edge of the Cloud (Oxford, 1969)
 Flambards in Summer (Oxford, 1969)
 Flambards Divided (1981)

For The Edge of the Cloud, Peyton won the annual Carnegie Medal from the Library Association, recognising the year's best children's book by a British subject. She was a commended runner-up for both the first and third books, the latter in competition with her Medal-winning work.

She also won the 1970 Guardian Children's Fiction Prize, conferred by The Guardian newspaper and judged by a panel of British children's writers. Ordinarily the prize recognises one fiction book published during the preceding calendar year; exceptionally Peyton won for the Flambards trilogy completed in 1969.

The trilogy was adapted as a 13-part television series in 1979, Flambards, starring Christine McKenna as Christina Parsons.

World Publishing issued a US edition of the first book in 1968, retaining the Ambrus illustrations. World (Cleveland and New York) also published US editions of the second and third books in 1969 and 1970, also with the original illustrations, although all three novels were reset with a greater page-counts.

See also

Notes

References

External links
  —immediately, first US edition
 
 a Flambards forum
 Flying Dreams – a Flambards fan page
 a Flambards fan page

British children's novels
Children's historical novels
Guardian Children's Fiction Prize-winning works
Pony books
Novels set in Essex
Novels about orphans
Novels by K. M. Peyton
1967 British novels
Series of children's books
1967 children's books
Oxford University Press books